Buildwas is a civil parish in Shropshire, England.  It contains 21 listed buildings that are recorded in the National Heritage List for England.  Of these, two are listed at Grade I, the highest of the three grades, and the others are at Grade II, the lowest grade.  The parish contains the village of Buildwas and the surrounding countryside.  The most important buildings in the parish are Buildwas Abbey, now in ruins, and Abbey House, the former abbot's lodgings; both are listed at Grade I.  The other listed buildings are houses, cottages, farmhouses, a church and memorials in the churchyard, a wall, and a milestone.


Key

Buildings

References

Citations

Sources

Lists of buildings and structures in Shropshire